Andrew Joseph Ruhan (born September 1962) is a British businessman and motor racing driver. Andrew Ruhan became successful during his 22 years of experience as business leader in the Data Centre industry globally (with total of 30 years of property development experience), Andy has extensively worked globally in the US, Europe, Middle East and Asia. His accomplishments have been recognised worldwide which includes being hailed as Ernst & Young, Entrepreneur of the Year 2001 awardee. He has been involved in a legal dispute with his former business partners over the profits from the sale of 37 Thistle Hotels in the 2000s

Career 
Ruhan joined the board of the Lotus F1 in 2013, and took control of the team the following season. His involvement in the team ended when Renault re-purchased the team in December 2015.

See also
 Gerald Martin Smith

References 

British businesspeople
British racing drivers
Living people
1962 births
Formula One team owners

24H Series drivers